Handley is an unincorporated community in Dallas County, in the U.S. state of Missouri.

History
A post office called Handley was established in 1900, and remained in operation until 1905. J. M. Handley, an early postmaster, gave the community his last name.

References

Unincorporated communities in Dallas County, Missouri
Unincorporated communities in Missouri